Bernd Mützelburg (born 17 January 1944 in Mainz) is a German diplomat. Since February 16, 2009 he has been working as a special envoy to Afghanistan and Pakistan.

He studied law at universities of Mainz and Marburg and later completed his M.A. at Fletcher School for Law and Diplomacy in Medford, Massachusetts.

From March 2006 to February 2009, he worked as an ambassador to India.

External links 
 Germany names Afghan-Pakistan envoy

1944 births
Living people
Johannes Gutenberg University Mainz alumni
University of Marburg alumni
The Fletcher School at Tufts University alumni
People from Mainz
Recipients of the Order of the Cross of Terra Mariana, 1st Class
Ambassadors of Germany to India